Steeve Gustan (born 26 January 1985 in Martinique) is a Martiniquais international footballer who plays for CS Bélimois Lamentin of the Martinique Promotion d'Honneur the second level of Martinique's football league system.

Career

Club
Gustan was signed by FC Girondins de Bordeaux of France's Ligue 1 in 2004 and was part of the reserve squad.   After 2 seasons with Bordeaux, Gustan returned to Martinique to play for Club Franciscain.  After five seasons with the club, Gustan signed for CS Bélimois Lamentin, another Martiniquais club, in 2011.

International
Gustan made his international debut on 9 June 2008 in a friendly against French Guiana. He scored his first international goal on 26 September 2010 against New Caledonia in the 2010 Coupe de l'Outre-Mer.

International goals 
Scores and results list Martinique's goal tally first.

References

1985 births
Living people
Martiniquais footballers
Martinique international footballers
Association football forwards
2013 CONCACAF Gold Cup players